Sestao is a town and municipality of 27,296 inhabitants located in the province of Biscay, in the autonomous community of Basque Country, northern Spain. It is in the left bank of the Estuary of Bilbao and part of Bilbao's metropolitan area.

Sestao was the place of the most important steel industry of Biscay, Altos Hornos de Vizcaya.

Neighbourhoods 
Sestao is administratively divided into 13 neighbourhoods or wards:
 Kasko
 Kueto
 Galindo
 Albiz
 Urbinaga
 Rebonza
 Azeta
 Simondrogas
 Txabarri
 Markonzaga
 Aizpuru
 Los Baños
 Las Llanas

Demography

Rehabilitation of Sestao 

Sestao, an industrial area in disuse placed in the province of the Basque Country (Spain), is located in the estuary of Bilbao. It appeared due to diverse economic, social and political forces, but it was the economic strength of the iron industry that proved to be the most important.
Over the last 20 years the city of Bilbao has transformed its riverbanks, pursuing urban, environmental and economic improvement. 
The recovery of these old industrial spaces and the relocation of port activities to the outer bay will allow the city to face its river front and start a general process of urban transformation. The spaces previously occupied by the shipyards, containers or blast furnaces, are to become promenades, parks, art galleries, new neighborhoods and areas of business of high environmental quality.

1:700.000 National scale 

The industrial crisis of the 80 affected greatly Bilbao. The closure and modernization of major industries was a major impact on the whole environment of the river and, at the same time, an opportunity to recover valuable land for urban development of the city.
The transformation of the city is creating an economic structure focused on services, culture and new industries. The river banks are now serving an urban strategy for environmental and economic improvement.
The estuary is therefore the backbone of the area, but it is also a strong barrier that separates both margins of the river: one with a much more industrial character and another one much more residential.
Sestao is the area that links all this area that will propose a real integral operation of all this area.

1:150:000 Regional scale 

Although the area seems isolated, thanks to the station Urbinaga, is perfectly integrated in the network of Metro Bilbao, connecting Bilbao with the Right Bank and Left, offering an essential service to the future citizens of "La Punta".

1:15:000 Urban scale. Evolution of area through time

Redensification 
La Punta is an abandoned edge of the town. Sestao has the highest unemployment rate in the Basque Country, due to the closure of large companies because of their restructuring; despite this fact it has no social facilities to help this portion of the population to improve. Comparing the residential areas of Sestao and Barakaldo with "La Punta", it seems necessary to densify this area and thus strengthen the bond between Barakaldo and Sestao, and the relationship with the right bank of the river.

Urban barriers 
The growth of the town of Sestao is limited by the lack of developable land and severely limited by natural and artificial barriers. For this reason, it has reached a highly densified town with a network of small open spaces. Historically, The grew of the population was a consequence of the development of the industry, and not the industry a consequence of the human presence in the area. This defines the DNA of Sestao. It is a settlement that is born exclusively by the implantation of the heavy industry. Consumption and land distribution is based on the industry (now there is more floor dedicated to industrial than residential uses) and these industrial areas are located in the best situations the city. The margin facing the estuary is colonized exclusively for industry, and the least quality areas (up to sixty meters of altitude) is intended to construction of workers' housing.

Natural Processes 
It is proposed that over time the vegetation in the low-lying industrial areas of the Galindo River estuary is slowly restored to a healthy state by actively cultivating the growth of plants that are naturally resistant to local soil contamination, and that improve soil and water quality through bio-remediation. Rather than a tabula rasa to be integrated into the city with a false topography, the industrial areas of Bilbao are in a new natural equilibrium condition. Working with these new natural conditions offers the possibility of an urbanism that combines urban and natural and responds to the fluctuations of the natural ecosystem of the river.

Since the appearance of the industry in 1875, the whole estuary became involved in the configuration of an industrial point of reference in the Spanish national scene of heavy industries. Meanwhile, the municipality of Sestao created the largest industrial base of the country.

http://visibleearth.nasa.gov

Prediction. Regeneration strategies

Network of public spaces 
The city will probably develop a system of small public spaces that provide residents moments of pause, rest, interactions and connections between the different urban levels.

Connection 
Connection of both margins of the river.

Facilities 
Program associated with the estuary and the existing water activity (Kaiku drifters).

Viewpoints 
Recovery of the convent as a viewpoint. The view shows the contrast between the industrial landscape lined by shipyard cranes and the historic mansions of the Basque bourgeoisie.

Tram 
Integration of the tram connected to Bilbao and the right bank of the river.

Rehabilitation 
Rehabilitation of ships in better condition to include public program to allow the language of industrial structures: from jetties, cranes, pipes, and temporary stairs to pylons.

Housing and facilities 
Housing and facilities of social nature.

Notable people 

 Félix Ayo, violinist
 Vicente Uribe, Minister of the Government of Spain
 Rosa Lavín, businesswoman
 Josu Calvo, astrophysicist
 Unai Núñez, footballer
 Santiago Urquiaga, footballer

Sources and citations 

Soriano, Federico (2007), FISURAS 14

VV.AA., Diccionario Metapolis de Arquitectura Avanzada, ACTAR, 2002

Rehabilitación de la Ría de Bilbao. PFC, VVAA. Universidad Politécnica de Madrid. 2014

VV.AA., PGOU Plan General de Organización Urbana de Sestao, 2010

VVAA, Slow Urbanism, Sestao. Europan 11, 2011

https://www.google.com/maps?q=SESTAO+BILBAO&gws_rd=ssl&um=1&ie=UTF-8&sa=X&ved=0ahUKEwi80qv7wPXPAhVLFT4KHdGcAfYQ_AUICCgB

References 

Municipalities in Biscay
Estuary of Bilbao